Monck may refer to:

People 
 Adrian Monck (born 1965), English academic, writer and journalist
 Sir Arthur Monck, 7th Baronet (1838–1933), British Member of Parliament
 Charles Monck (disambiguation), several people:
Charles Monck (1678–1751), Irish MP for Newcastle and Inistiogue
Charles Monck, 1st Viscount Monck (1754–1802), Irish nobleman
Charles Monck, 3rd Viscount Monck (1791–1849), Irish nobleman
Charles Monck, 4th Viscount Monck (1819–1894), Governor General of Canada
Sir Charles Monck, 6th Baronet (1779–1867), English nobleman
 Chip Monck (born 1939), American lighting designer and emcee at the 1969 Woodstock Festival
 Christopher Monck, 2nd Duke of Albemarle (1653–1688), English statesman and failed soldier
 Francis Ward Monck (born 1842), British clergyman and spiritualist medium who was exposed as a fraud
 George Monck, 1st Duke of Albemarle (1608–1670), English soldier and naval officer
Henry Monck, 1st Earl of Rathdowne and 2nd Viscount Monck (1785–1848), Irish nobleman
 Jack Monck (born 1950), British musician
 Mary Monck (1677?–1715), Irish poet
 Nicholas Monck (–1661), Bishop of Hereford
 Thomas Monck (1570–1627), English Member of Parliament
 Walter Nugent Monck (1877–1958), English theatre director
 William Henry Stanley Monck (1839–1915), Irish astronomer and philosopher

Other uses 
 Monck (electoral district), a historic electoral district in Canada
 Monck Provincial Park, British Columbia, Canada
 , British Royal Navy ship or shore establishment
 Viscount Monck, a title in the Peerage of Ireland

See also
 Moncks Corner
 Monck Mason (disambiguation)
 Monk (disambiguation)